The Archeological Museum of Marathon is a museum in Marathon, Attica, Greece. The museum mainly houses findings originating from the Battle of Marathon and from the Egyptian temple built nearby.

Gallery

External links
Ministry of Culture and Tourism
Archaeological Museum of Marathon - Ebook by Latsis Foundation

Marathon
Marathon, Greece
Battle of Marathon
Buildings and structures in East Attica